Juventus Football Club (from , , 'youth'), colloquially known as Juve, is a professional football club based in Turin, Piedmont, Italy, that competes in the Serie A, the top tier of the Italian football league system. Founded in 1897 by a group of Torinese students, the club has worn a black and white striped home kit since 1903 and has played home matches in different grounds around its city, the latest being the 41,507-capacity Juventus Stadium. Nicknamed  ("the Old Lady"), the club has won 36 official league titles, 14 Coppa Italia titles and nine Supercoppa Italiana titles, being the record holder for all these competitions; two Intercontinental Cups, two European Cups / UEFA Champions Leagues, one European Cup Winners' Cup, a joint national record of three UEFA Cups, two UEFA Super Cups and a joint national record of one UEFA Intertoto Cup. Consequently, the side leads the historical Federazione Italiana Giuoco Calcio (FIGC) classification, whilst on the international stage the club occupies the sixth position in Europe and the twelfth in the world for most confederation titles won with eleven trophies, as well as the fourth in the all-time Union of European Football Associations (UEFA) competitions ranking, having obtained the highest coefficient score during seven seasons since its introduction in 1979, the most for an Italian team in both cases and joint second overall in the last cited.

Founded with the name of Sport-Club Juventus, initially as an athletics club, it is the second oldest of its kind still active in the country after Genoa's football section (1893) and has competed every season of the premier club division (reformulated in different formats until the Serie A inception in 1929) since its debut in 1900 with the exception of the 2006–07 season, being managed by the industrial Agnelli family almost continuously since 1923. The relationship between the club and that dynasty is the oldest and longest in national sports, making Juventus one of the first professional sporting clubs ante litteram in the country, having established itself as a major force in the national stage since the 1930s and at confederation level since the mid-1970s, and becoming, in a nearly stable basis, one of the top-ten wealthiest in world football in terms of value, revenue and profit since the mid-1990s, being listed on the Borsa Italiana since 2001.

Under the management of Giovanni Trapattoni, the club won 13 trophies in the ten years before 1986, including six league titles and five international titles, and became the first to win all three seasonal competitions organised by the Union of European Football Associations: the 1976–77 UEFA Cup (first Southern European side to do so), the 1983–84 Cup Winners' Cup and the 1984–85 European Champions' Cup. With successive triumphs in the 1984 European Super Cup and 1985 Intercontinental Cup, it became the first and thus far only in the world to complete a clean sweep of all five historical confederation trophies; an achievement that they revalidated with the title won in the 1999 UEFA Intertoto Cup after another successful era led by Marcello Lippi, becoming in addition, until 2022, the only professional Italian club to have won every ongoing honour available to the first team and organised by a national or international football association. In December 2000, Juventus was placed seventh in the FIFA's historic ranking of the best clubs in the world, and nine years later was ranked second best club in Europe during the 20th century based on a statistical study series by the International Federation of Football History & Statistics (IFFHS), the highest for an Italian club in both.

The club's fan base is the largest at national level and one of the largest worldwide. Juventus players have won eight Ballon d'Or awards, four of these in consecutive years (1982–1985, an overall joint record), among these Michel Platini as well as three of the five recipients with Italian nationality as the first player representing Serie A, Omar Sívori, and the former member of the youth sector Paolo Rossi; they have also won four FIFA World Player of the Year awards, with winners as Roberto Baggio and Zinedine Zidane, a national record and third and joint second highest overall, respectively, in the cited prizes. Finally, the club has also provided the most players to the Italy national team—mostly in official competitions in almost uninterrupted way since 1924—who often formed the group that led the Azzurri squad to international success, most importantly in the 1934, 1982 and 2006 FIFA World Cups.

History

Early years (1897–1918) 

Juventus was founded as Sport-Club Juventus in late 1897 by pupils from the Massimo d'Azeglio Lyceum school in Turin, among them Eugenio Canfari and Enrico Canfari. It was renamed as Foot-Ball Club Juventus two years later. The club joined the 1900 Italian Football Championship. Juventus played their first Italian Football Championship match on 11 March 1900 in a 1–0 defeat against Torinese.

In 1904, businessman Marco Ajmone-Marsan revived the finances of Juventus, making it possible to transfer the training field from piazza d'armi to the more appropriate Velodrome Umberto I. During this period, the team wore a pink and black kit. Juventus first won the 1905 Italian Football Championship while playing at their Velodrome Umberto I ground. By this time, the club colours had changed to black and white stripes, inspired by English side Notts County.

There was a split at the club in 1906, after some of the staff considered moving Juve out of Turin. Alfred Dick, the club's president, was unhappy with this, and left with some prominent players to found FBC Torino, which in turn spawned the Derby della Mole. Juventus spent much of this period steadily rebuilding after the split, surviving the First World War.

League dominance (1923–1980) 

FIAT vicepresident Edoardo Agnelli was elected club's president in 1923 and a new stadium was inaugurated one year before. This helped the club to its second league championship in the 1925–26 Prima Divisione, after beating Alba Roma in a two-legged final with an aggregate score of 12–1. The club established itself as a major force in Italian football since the 1930s, becoming the country's first professional club and the first with a decentralised fan base, which led it to win a record of five consecutive Italian football championships and form the core of the Italy national football team during the Vittorio Pozzo's era, including the 1934 FIFA World Cup champions, with star players like Raimundo Orsi, Luigi Bertolini, Giovanni Ferrari, and Luis Monti, among others. As of 2022, it is the club with the most FIFA World Cup champions at 27.

Juventus moved to the Stadio Comunale, but for the rest of the 1930s and the majority of the 1940s they were unable to recapture championship dominance. After the Second World War, Gianni Agnelli was appointed president. In the late 1940s and early 1950s, the club added two more league championships to its name, winning the 1949–50 Serie A under the management of Englishman Jesse Carver, and then repeating in the 1951–52 Serie A. For the 1957–58 Serie A, two new strikers, Welshman John Charles and Italian Argentine Omar Sívori, were signed to play alongside longtime member Giampiero Boniperti. In the 1959–60 Juventus F.C. season, they beat Fiorentina to complete their first league and cup double, winning the 1959–60 Serie A and the 1960 Coppa Italia final. Boniperti retired in 1961 as the all-time top scorer at the club, with 182 goals in all competitions, a club record that stood for 45 years.

During the rest of the decade, the club only won the 1966–67 Serie A. The 1970s saw Juventus further solidify their strong position in Italian football, and under former player Čestmír Vycpálek they won the scudetto in the 1971–72 Serie A, and followed through in the 1972–73 Serie A, with players like as Roberto Bettega, Franco Causio, and José Altafini breaking through. During the rest of the decade, they won the league thrice more, with defender Gaetano Scirea contributing significantly. The latter two success in Serie A was under Giovanni Trapattoni, who also led the club to their first ever major European title, the 1976–77 UEFA Cup, and helped the club's domination continue on into the early part of the 1980s.

European stage (1980–1993) 

The Trapattoni era was highly successful in the 1980s and the club started the decade off well, winning the league title three more times by 1984. This meant Juventus had won 20 Italian league titles and were allowed to add a second golden star to their shirt, becoming the only Italian club to achieve this. Around this time, the club's players were attracting considerable attention, and Paolo Rossi was named European Footballer of the Year following his contribution to Italy's victory in the 1982 FIFA World Cup, where he was named Player of the Tournament.

Frenchman Michel Platini was awarded the European Footballer of the Year title for three years in a row in 1983, 1984 and 1985, which is a record. Juventus are the first and one of the only two clubs to have players from their club winning the award in four consecutive years. It was Platini who scored the winning goal in the 1985 European Cup final against Liverpool; this was marred by the Heysel Stadium disaster, which changed European football. That year, Juventus became the first club in the history of European football to have won all three major UEFA competitions; after their triumph in the 1985 Intercontinental Cup, the club also became the first and thus far the only in association football history to have won all five possible confederation competitions, an achievement that it revalidated with a sixth title won in the 1999 UEFA Intertoto Cup.

With the exception of winning the closely contested 1985–86 Serie A, the rest of the 1980s were not very successful for the club. As well as having to contend with Diego Maradona's Napoli, both of the Milanese clubs, A.C. Milan and Inter Milan, won Italian championships; Juventus achieved a double by winning the 1989–90 Coppa Italia and the 1990 UEFA Cup final under the guidance of former club legend Dino Zoff. In 1990, Juventus also moved into their new home, the Stadio delle Alpi, which was built for the 1990 FIFA World Cup. Despite the arrival of Italian star Roberto Baggio later that year for a world football transfer record fee, the early 1990s under Luigi Maifredi and subsequently Trapattoni once again also saw little success for Juventus, as they only managed to win the 1993 UEFA Cup final.

Renewed international success (1994–2004) 

Marcello Lippi took over as Juventus manager at the start of the 1994–95 Serie A. His first season at the helm of the club was a successful one, as Juventus recorded their first Serie A championship title since the mid-1980s, as well as the 1995 Coppa Italia final. The crop of players during this period featured Ciro Ferrara, Roberto Baggio, Gianluca Vialli, and a young Alessandro Del Piero. Lippi led Juventus to the 1995 Supercoppa Italiana and the 1995–96 UEFA Champions League, beating Ajax on penalties after a 1–1 draw in which Fabrizio Ravanelli scored for Juventus.

The club did not rest long after winning the European Cup, as more highly regarded players were brought into the fold in the form of Zinedine Zidane, Filippo Inzaghi, and Edgar Davids. At home, Juventus won the 1996–97 Serie A, successfully defended their title in the 1997–98 Serie A, won the 1996 UEFA Super Cup, and followed through with the 1996 Intercontinental Cup. Juventus reached two consecutive Champions League finals during this period but lost out to Borussia Dortmund and Real Madrid, respectively in 1997 and 1998.

After a two-and-a-half-season absence, Lippi returned to the club in 2001, following his replacement Carlo Ancelotti's dismissal, signing big name players like Gianluigi Buffon, David Trezeguet, Pavel Nedvěd, and Lilian Thuram, helping the team to win the 2001–02 Serie A, which was their first since 1998, and confirmed themselves in the 2002–03 Serie A. Juventus were also part of the all Italian 2003 UEFA Champions League final but lost out to Milan on penalties after the game ended in a 0–0 draw. At the conclusion of the following season, Lippi was appointed as the Italy national team's head coach, bringing an end to one of the most fruitful managerial spells in Juventus' history.

Calciopoli scandal (2004–2007) 
Fabio Capello was appointed as Juventus' coach in 2004 and led the club to two more consecutive Serie A first places. In May 2006, Juventus emerged as one of the five clubs linked to the Calciopoli scandal. In July, Juventus was placed at the bottom of the league table and relegated to Serie B for the first time in its history. The club was also stripped of the 2004–05 Serie A title, while the 2005–06 Serie A winner, after a period sub judice, was declared to be third-placed Inter Milan. This remains a much debated and controversial issue, particularly due to Inter Milan's later revealed involvement, the 2004 championship (the sole being investigated) deemed regular and not fixed, Juventus being absolved as club in the ordinary justice proceedings, their renounce to the Italian civil courts appeal, which could have cleared the club's name and avoid relegation, after FIFA threatened to suspend the Italian Football Federation (FIGC) and barring all Italian clubs from international play, and the motivations, such as sentimento popolare (people's feelings), and the newly created ad-hoc rule used to relegate the club.

Many key players left following their relegation to Serie B, including Thuram, star striker Zlatan Ibrahimović, midfielders Emerson and Patrick Viera, and defensive stalwarts Fabio Cannavaro and Gianluca Zambrotta; other big name players, such as Del Piero, Buffon, Trezeguet, and Nedvěd, as well as the club's future defense core Giorgio Chiellini, remained to help the club return to Serie A, while youngsters from the Campionato Nazionale Primavera (youth team), such as Sebastian Giovinco and Claudio Marchisio, were integrated into the first team. Juventus won the Cadetti title (Serie B championship) despite starting with a points deduction and gained promotion straight back up to the top division, with Del Piero claiming the top scorer award with 21 goals, as league winners after the 2006–07 Serie B season.

As early as 2010, when many other clubs were implicated and Inter Milan, Livorno, and Milan liable of direct Article 6 violations in the 2011 Palazzi Report, Juventus considered challenging the stripping of their scudetto from 2006 and the non-assignment of the 2005 title, dependent on the results of Calciopoli trials connected to the 2006 scandal. When former general manager Luciano Moggi's conviction in criminal court in connection with the scandal was partially written off by the Supreme Court in March 2015, the club sued the FIGC for €443 million for damages caused by their 2006 relegation. Then-FIGC president Carlo Tavecchio offered to discuss reinstatement of the lost scudetti in exchange for Juventus dropping the lawsuit.

In September 2015, the Supreme Court released a 150-page document that explained its final ruling of the case, based on the controversial 2006 sports ruling, which did not take in consideration the other clubs involved because they could not be put on trial due to the statute of limitations, and it would be necessary to request and open a revocation of judgment pursuant to Article 39 of the Code of Sports Justice. Despite his remaining charges being cancelled without a new trial due to statute of limitations, the court confirmed that Moggi was actively involved in the sporting fraud, which was intended to favour Juventus and increase his own personal benefits according to La Gazzetta dello Sport. As did the Naples court in 2012, the court commented that the developments and behavior of other clubs and executives were not investigated in depth. Once they exhausted their appeals in Italy's courts, both Moggi and Giraudo appealed to the European Court of Human Rights in March 2020; Giraudo's was accepted in September 2021. Juventus continued to present new appeals, which were declared inadmissible.

Return to Serie A (2007–2011) 
After making their comeback for the 2007–08 Serie A, Juventus appointed Claudio Ranieri as manager. They finished in third place in their first season back in the top flight and qualified for the 2008–09 UEFA Champions League's third qualifying round in the preliminary stages. Juventus reached the group stages, where they beat Real Madrid in both home and away legs, before losing in the knockout round to Chelsea. Ranieri was sacked following a string of unsuccessful results and Ciro Ferrara was appointed as manager on a temporary basis for the last two games of the 2008–09 Serie A, before being subsequently appointed as the manager for the 2009–10 Serie A.

Ferrara's stint as Juventus manager proved to be unsuccessful, with Juventus knocked out of 2009–10 UEFA Champions League, and also of the 2009–10 Coppa Italia, as well as just lying on the sixth place in the league table at the end of January 2010, leading to the dismissal of Ferrara and the naming of Alberto Zaccheroni as caretaker manager. Zaccheroni could not help the side improve, as Juventus finished the season in seventh place in Serie A. For the 2010–11 Serie A, Jean-Claude Blanc was replaced by Andrea Agnelli as the club's president. Agnelli's first action was to replace Zaccheroni and director of sport Alessio Secco with Sampdoria manager Luigi Delneri and director of sport Giuseppe Marotta. Delneri failed to improve their fortunes and was dismissed, and former player and fan favourite Antonio Conte, fresh after winning promotion with Siena, was named as Delneri's replacement. In September 2011, Juventus relocated to the new Juventus Stadium, known as the Allianz Stadium since 2017.

Nine consecutive scudetti (2011–2020) 

With Conte as manager, Juventus were unbeaten for the entire 2011–12 Serie A season. Towards the second half of the season, the team was mostly competing with northern rivals Milan for first place in a tight contest. Juventus won the title on the 37th matchday after beating Cagliari 2–0 and Milan losing to Inter 4–2. After a 3–1 win in the final matchday against Atalanta, Juventus became the first team to go the season unbeaten in the current 38-game format. In 2013–14 Serie A, Juventus won a third consecutive scudetto with a record 102 points and 33 wins. The title was the 30th official league championship in the club's history. They also achieved the semi-finals of 2013–14 UEFA Europa League, where they were eliminated at home against ten-man Benfica's catenaccio, missing the 2014 UEFA Europa League final at the Juventus Stadium.

In the 2014–15 Serie A, Massimiliano Allegri was appointed as manager, with whom Juventus won their 31st official title, making it a fourth-straight, as well as achieving a record tenth Coppa Italia, after beating Lazio 2–2 in the 2015 Coppa Italia final, for the domestic double. The club also beat Real Madrid 3–2 on aggregate in the semi-finals of the 2014–15 UEFA Champions League to face Barcelona in the 2015 UEFA Champions League final in Berlin for the first time since the 2002–03 UEFA Champions League.  Juventus lost the final against Barcelona 3–1. In the 2016 Coppa Italia final, the club won the title for the 11th time and second straight win, becoming the first team in Italy's history to win Serie A and Coppa Italia doubles in back-to-back seasons.

In the 2017 Coppa Italia final,  Juventus won their 12th Coppa Italia title in a 2–0 win over Lazio, becoming the first team to win three consecutive titles. Four days later on 21 May, Juventus became the first team to win six consecutive Serie A titles. In the 2017 UEFA Champions League final, their second Champions League final in three years, Juventus were defeated 1–4 by defending champions Real Madrid; the 2017 Turin stampede happened ten minutes before the end of the match. In the 2018 Coppa Italia final, Juventus won their 13th title and fourth in a row in a 4–0 win over Milan, extending the all-time record of successive Coppa Italia titles. Juventus then secured their seventh consecutive Serie A title, extending the all-time record of successive triumphs in the competition. In the 2018 Supercoppa Italiana, which was held in January 2019, Juventus and Milan, who were tied for Supercoppa Italiana wins with seven each, played against each other; Juventus won their eight title after beating Milan 1–0. In April 2019, Juventus secured their eighth consecutive Serie A title, further extending the all-time record of successive triumphs in the competition. Following Allegri's departure, Maurizio Sarri was appointed manager of the club ahead of the 2019–20 Juventus F.C. season. Juventus were confirmed 2019–20 Serie A champions, reaching an unprecedented milestone of nine consecutive league titles.

Recent history (2020–present) 
On 8 August 2020, Sarri was sacked from his managerial position, one day after Juventus were eliminated from the 2019–20 UEFA Champions League by Lyon. On the same day, former player Andrea Pirlo was announced as the new coach, signing a two-year contract. In the 2020 Supercoppa Italiana, which was held in January 2021, Juventus won their ninth title after a 2–0 victory against Napoli. With Inter Milan's win of the 2020–21 Serie A, Juventus' run of nine consecutive titles came to an end; the club managed to secure a fourth-place finish on the final day of the league, granting Juventus qualification to the following season's Champions League. In the 2021 Coppa Italia final, Juventus won their 14th title. On 28 May, Juventus sacked Pirlo from his managerial position, and announced Allegri's return to the club as manager after two years away from management. After losing 4–2 after extra time to Inter Milan in the 2022 Coppa Italia final, the 2021–22 Juventus F.C. season marked the first year since 2010–11 in which the club had not won a trophy.

On 28 November 2022, the entire board of directors resigned from their respective positions, Andrea Agnelli as president, Pavel Nedvěd as vice president, and Maurizio Arrivabene as CEO. Exor, the club's controlling shareholder, appointed Gianluca Ferrero as its new chairman ahead of the shareholders' meeting on 18 January 2023. Two days later, after being acquitted by the FIGC's Court of Appeal in April–May 2022, Juventus were deducted 15 points as punishment for capital gain violations, as part of an investigation related to the 2019–2021 budgets during the COVID-19 pandemic starting in November 2021. This was harsher than the point deduction recommended by the FIGC prosecutor, who said that in the standings Juventus "must now finish behind Roma, outside the European Cup area"; the club announced its intentions to appeal. The penalty caused an uproar and protests among Juventus supporters, who cancelled, or threatened to do so, their Sky Sport and DAZN subscriptions.

Crest and colours 

Juventus have played in black and white striped shirts, with white shorts, sometimes black shorts since 1903. Originally, they played in pink shirts with a black tie. The father of one of the players made the earliest shirts, but continual washing faded the colour so much that in 1903 the club sought to replace them. Juventus asked one of their team members, Englishman John Savage, if he had any contacts in England who could supply new shirts in a colour that would better withstand the elements. He had a friend who lived in Nottingham, who being a Notts County supporter, shipped out the black and white striped shirts to Turin. Juventus have worn the shirts ever since, considering the colours to be aggressive and powerful.

Juventus' official emblem has undergone different and small modifications since the 1920s. The previous modification of the Juventus badge took place in 2004, when the emblem of the team changed to a black-and-white oval shield of a type used by Italian ecclesiastics. It is divided in five vertical stripes: two white stripes and three black stripes, inside which are the following elements, while in its upper section the name of the society superimposed on a white convex section, over golden curvature (gold for honour). The white silhouette of a charging bull is in the lower section of the oval shield, superimposed on a black old French shield and the charging bull is a symbol of the comune of Turin. There is also a black silhouette of a mural crown above the black spherical triangle's base. This is a reminiscence to Augusta Tourinorum, the old city of the Roman era which the present capital of Piedmont region is its cultural heiress.

In January 2017, president Andrea Agnelli announced the change to the Juventus badge for a logotype. More specifically, it is a pictogram composed by a stylized Black and White "J" which Agnelli said reflects "the Juventus way of living." Juventus was the first team in sports history to adopt a star as a symbol associated with any competition's triumph, who added one above their badge in 1958 to represent their tenth Italian Football Championship and Serie A title, and has since become popularized with other clubs as well.

In the past, the convex section of the emblem had a blue colour (another symbol of Turin) and it was concave in shape. The old French shield and the mural crown, also in the lower section of the emblem, had a considerably greater size. The two "Golden Stars for Sport Excellence" were located above the convex and concave section of Juventus' emblem. During the 1980s, the club emblem was the blurred silhouette of a zebra, alongside the two golden stars with the club's name forming an arc above.

Juventus unofficially won their 30th league title in 2011–12, but a dispute with the FIGC, which stripped Juventus of their 2004–05 title and did not assign them the 2005–06 title due to their involvement in the Calciopoli scandal, left their official total at 28; the club elected to wear no stars at all the following season. Juventus won their 30th title in 2013–14 and thus earned the right to wear their third star, but Agnelli stated that the club suspended the use of the stars until another team wins their 20th championship, having the right to wear two stars "to emphasise the difference". For the 2015–16 season, Juventus reintroduced the stars and added the third star to their jersey as well with new kit manufacturers Adidas, in addition to the Coppa Italia badge for winning their tenth Coppa Italia the previous season. For the 2016–17 season, Juventus re-designed their kit with a different take on the trademark black and white stripes. For the 2017–18 season, Juventus introduced the J shaped logo onto the kits.

In September 2015, Juventus officially announced a new project called JKids for its junior supporters on its website. Along with this project, Juventus also introduced a new mascot to all its fans which is called J. J is a cartoon-designed zebra, black and white stripes with golden edge piping on its body, golden shining eyes, and three golden stars on the front of its neck. J made its debut at Juventus Stadium on 12 September 2015.

During its history, the club has acquired a number of nicknames, la Vecchia Signora (the Old Lady) being the best example. The "old" part of the nickname is a pun on Juventus which means "youth" in Latin. It was derived from the age of the Juventus star players towards the middle of the 1930s. The "lady" part of the nickname is how fans of the club affectionately referred to it before the 1930s. The club is also nicknamed la Fidanzata d'Italia (the Girlfriend of Italy), because over the years it has received a high level of support from Southern Italian immigrant workers (particularly from Naples and Palermo), who arrived in Turin to work for FIAT since the 1930s. Other nicknames include; [La] Madama (Piedmontese for Madam), i bianconeri (the black-and-whites), le zebre (the zebras) in reference to Juventus' colours. I gobbi (the hunchbacks) is the nickname that is used to define Juventus supporters, but is also used sometimes for team's players. The most widely accepted origin of gobbi dates to the fifties, when the bianconeri wore a large jersey. When players ran on the field, the jersey, which had a laced opening at the chest, generated a bulge over the back (a sort of parachute effect), making the players look hunchbacked.

The official anthem of Juventus is Juve (storia di un grande amore), or Juve (story of a great love) in English, written by Alessandra Torre and Claudio Guidetti, in the version of the singer and musician Paolo Belli composed in 2007. In 2016, a documentary film called Black and White Stripes: The Juventus Story was produced by the La Villa brothers about Juventus. On 16 February 2018, the first three episodes of a docu-series called First Team: Juventus, which followed the club throughout the season, by spending time with the players behind the scenes both on and off the field, was released on Netflix; the other three episodes were released on 6 July 2018. On 25 November 2021, an eight-episode docu-series called All or Nothing: Juventus, which followed the club throughout the season, by spending time with the players behind the scenes both on and off the field, was released on Amazon Prime.

Stadiums 

After the first two years (1897 and 1898), during which Juventus played in the Parco del Valentino and Parco Cittadella, their matches were held in the Piazza d'Armi Stadium until 1908, except in 1905 (the first year of the scudetto) and in 1906, years in which they played at the Corso Re Umberto.

From 1909 to 1922, Juventus played their internal competitions at Corso Sebastopoli Camp before moving the following year to Corso Marsiglia Camp, where they remained until 1933, winning four league titles. At the end of 1933, they began to play at the new Stadio Benito Mussolini inaugurated for the 1934 World Championships. After the Second World War, the stadium was renamed as Stadio Comunale Vittorio Pozzo. Juventus played home matches at the ground for 57 years, a total of 890 league matches. The team continued to host training sessions at the stadium until July 2003.

From 1990 until the 2005–06 season, the Torinese side contested their home matches at Stadio delle Alpi, built for the 1990 FIFA World Cup, although in very rare circumstances the club played some home games in other stadia such as Renzo Barbera at Palermo, Dino Manuzzi in Cesena and the Stadio Giuseppe Meazza in Milan.

In August 2006, Juventus returned to play in the Stadio Comunale, then known as Stadio Olimpico, after the restructuring of the stadium for the 2006 Winter Olympics onward. In November 2008, Juventus announced that they would invest around €120 million to build a new ground, the Juventus Stadium, on the site of delle Alpi. Unlike the old ground, there is not a running track and instead the pitch is only 7.5 metres away from the stands. The capacity is 41,507. Work began during spring 2009 and the stadium was opened on 8 September 2011, ahead of the start of the 2011–12 season. Since 1 July 2017, the Juventus Stadium is known commercially as the Allianz Stadium of Turin until 30 June 2030.

Supporters 

Juventus is the most-supported football club in Italy, with over 12 million fans or tifosi, which represent approximately 34% of the total Italian football fans according to a research published in September 2016 by Italian research agency Demos & Pi, as well as one of the most supported football clubs in the world, with over 300 million supporters (41 million in Europe alone), particularly in the Mediterranean countries to which a large number of Italian diaspora have emigrated. The Torinese side has fan clubs branches across the globe.

Demand for Juventus tickets in occasional home games held away from Turin is high, suggesting that Juventus have stronger support in other parts of the country. Juventus is widely and especially popular throughout mainland Southern Italy, Sicily and Malta, leading the team to have one of the largest followings in its away matches, more than in Turin itself.

Club rivalries 

Juventus have significant rivalries with two main clubs.

Their traditional rivals are fellow Turin club Torino; matches between the two sides are known as the Derby della Mole (Turin Derby). The rivalry dates back to 1906 as Torino was founded by break-away Juventus players and staff.

Their most high-profile rivalry is with Inter, another big Serie A club located in Milan, the capital of the neighbouring region of Lombardy. Matches between these two clubs are referred to as the Derby d'Italia (Derby of Italy) and the two regularly challenge each other at the top of the league table, hence the intense rivalry. Until the Calciopoli scandal which saw Juventus forcibly relegated, the two were the only Italian clubs to have never played below Serie A. Notably, the two sides are the first and the third most supported clubs in Italy and the rivalry has intensified since the later part of the 1990s; reaching its highest levels ever post-Calciopoli, with the return of Juventus to Serie A.

The rivalry with AC Milan is a rivalry between the two most titled and supported teams in Italy. The challenge confronts also two of the clubs with greater basin of supporters as well as those with the greatest turnover and stock market value in the country. The match-ups between Milan and Juventus, is regarded as the championship of Serie A, and both teams were often fighting for the top positions of the standings, sometimes even decisive for the award of the title. They also have rivalries with Roma, Fiorentina and Napoli.

Youth programme 

The Juventus youth set-up has been recognised as one of the best in Italy for producing young talents. While not all graduates made it to the first team, many have enjoyed successful careers in the Italian top flight. Under long-time coach Vincenzo Chiarenza, the Primavera (under-19) squad enjoyed one of its successful periods, winning all age-group competitions from 2004 to 2006. Like Dutch club Ajax and many Premier League clubs, Juventus operates several satellite clubs and football schools outside of the country (i.e. United States, Canada, Greece, Saudi Arabia, Australia and Switzerland) and numerous camps in the local region to expand talent scouting. On 3 August 2018, Juventus founded their professional reserve team, called Juventus U23 (renamed to Juventus Next Gen in August 2022), playing in Serie C, who won the Coppa Italia Serie C in 2020. In the 2021–22 UEFA Youth League, the U19 squad reached the semi-finals, equalling the best-ever placing in the competition for a Serie A team.

The youth system is also notable for its contribution to the Italian national senior and youth teams. 1934 World Cup winner Gianpiero Combi, 1936 Gold Medal and 1938 World Cup winner Pietro Rava, Giampiero Boniperti, Roberto Bettega, 1982 World Cup hero Paolo Rossi and more recently Claudio Marchisio and Sebastian Giovinco are a number of former graduates who have gone on to make the first team and full Italy squad.

Players

First-team squad

Juventus Next Gen and youth academy

Other players under contract

Out on loan

Coaching staff

Chairmen history 

Juventus have had overall 24 presidents ( or ) and two administrative committees, some of which have been members of the club's main stakeholder group and elected since the club's foundation by the then assemblea di soci (membership assembly) through an annual meeting. Since 1949, they have been often corporate managers that were nominated in charge by the assemblea degli azionisti (stakeholders assembly). On top of chairmen, there were several living former presidents, that were nominated as the honorary chairmen.

Managerial history 

Below is a list of Juventus managers from 1923, when the Agnelli family took over and the club became more structured and organised, until the present day.

Honours 

Italy's most successful club of the 20th century and the most winning in the history of Italian football, Juventus have won the Italian League Championship, the country's premier football club competition and organised by Lega Nazionale Professionisti Serie A (LNPA), a record 36 times and have the record of consecutive triumphs in that tournament (nine, between 2011–12 and 2019–20). They have also won the Coppa Italia, the country's primary single-elimination competition, a record 14 times, becoming the first team to retain the trophy successfully with their triumph in the 1959–60 season, and the first to win it in three consecutive seasons from the 2014–15 season to the 2016–17 season, going on to win a fourth consecutive title in 2017–18 (also a record). In addition, the club holds the record for Supercoppa Italiana wins with nine, the most recent coming in 2020.

Overall, Juventus have won 70 official competitions, more than any other club in the country: 59 at national level (which is also a record) and 11 at international stage, making them, in the latter case, the second most successful Italian team. The club is sixth in Europe and twelfth in the world with the most international titles won officially recognised by their respective association football confederation and Fédération Internationale de Football Association (FIFA). In 1977, the Torinese side become the first in Southern Europe to have won the UEFA Cup and the first—and only to date—in Italian football history to achieve an international title with a squad composed by national footballers. In 1993, the club won its third competition's trophy, an unprecedented feat in the continent until then, a confederation record for the next 22 years and the most for an Italian team. Juventus was also the first club in the country to achieve the title in the European Super Cup, having won the competition in 1984 and the first European side to win the Intercontinental Cup in 1985, since it was restructured by Union of European Football Associations (UEFA) and Confederación Sudamericana de Fútbol (CONMEBOL)'s organizing committee five years beforehand.

The club has earned the distinction of being allowed to wear three golden stars on its shirts representing its league victories, the tenth of which was achieved during the 1957–58 season, the 20th in the 1981–82 season and the 30th in the 2013–14 season. Juventus were the first Italian team to have achieved the national double four times (winning the Italian top tier division and the national cup competition in the same season), in the 1959–60, 1994–95, 2014–15 and 2015–16 seasons. In the 2015–16 season, Juventus won the Coppa Italia for the 11th time and their second-straight title, becoming the first team in Italy's history to complete Serie A and Coppa Italia doubles in back-to-back seasons; Juventus would go on to win another two consecutive doubles in 2016–17 and 2017–18.

Until the first Europa Conference League final in 2022, the club was unique in the world in having won all official confederation competitions and they have received, in recognition to winning the three major UEFA competitions—first case in the history of the European football and the only one to be reached with the same coach spell— The UEFA Plaque by the Union of European Football Associations (UEFA) on 12 July 1988.

The Torinese side was placed seventh in the FIFA's century ranking of the best clubs in the world on 23 December 2000 and nine years later was ranked second best club in Europe during the 20th Century based on a statistical study series by International Federation of Football History & Statistics, the highest for an Italian club in both.

Juventus have been proclaimed World's Club Team of the Year twice (1993 and 1996) and was ranked in 3rd place—the highest ranking of any Italian club—in the All-Time Club World Ranking (1991–2009 period) by the IFFHS.

Club statistics and records 

Alessandro Del Piero holds Juventus' official appearance record of 705 appearances. He took over from Gaetano Scirea on 6 April 2008 against Palermo. He also holds the record for Serie A appearances with 478. Including all official competitions, Del Piero is the all-time leading goalscorer for Juventus, with 290—since joining the club in 1993. Giampiero Boniperti, who was the all-time topscorer since 1961 comes in second in all competitions with 182. In the 1933–34 season, Felice Borel scored 31 goals in 34 appearances, setting the club record for Serie A goals in a single season. Ferenc Hirzer is the club's highest scorer in a single season with 35 goals in 24 appearances in the 1925–26 season. The most goals scored by a player in a single match is 6, which is also an Italian record. This was achieved by Omar Sívori in a game against Inter in the 1960–61 season.

The first ever official game participated in by Juventus was in the Third Federal Football Championship, the predecessor of Serie A, against Torinese in a Juventus loss 0–1. The biggest victory recorded by Juventus was 15–0 against Cento, in the second round of the 1926–27 Coppa Italia. In the league, Fiorentina and Fiumana were famously on the end of Juventus' biggest championship wins, with both beaten 11–0 in the 1928–29 season. Juventus' heaviest championship defeats came during the 1911–12 and 1912–13 seasons: they were against Milan in 1912 (1–8) and Torino in 1913 (0–8).

The signing of Gianluigi Buffon in 2001 from Parma cost Juventus €52 million (100 billion lire), making it the then-most expensive transfer for a goalkeeper of all-time until 2018. On 20 March 2016, Buffon set a new Serie A record for the longest period without conceding a goal (974 minutes) in the Derby della Mole during the 2015–16 season. On 26 July 2016, Argentine forward Gonzalo Higuaín became the third highest football transfer of all-time and highest ever transfer for an Italian club, at the time, when he was signed by Juventus for €90 million from Napoli. On 8 August 2016, Paul Pogba returned to his first club, Manchester United, for an all-time record for highest football transfer fee of €105 million, surpassing the former record holder Gareth Bale. The sale of Zinedine Zidane from Juventus to Real Madrid of Spain in 2001 was the world football transfer record at the time, costing the Spanish club around €77.5 million (150 billion lire). On 10 July 2018, Cristiano Ronaldo became the highest ever transfer for an Italian club with his €100 million transfer from Real Madrid.

UEFA club coefficient ranking

Contribution to the Italy national team 

Overall, Juventus are the club that has contributed the most players to the Italy national team in history, being the only Italian club that has contributed players to every Italy national team since the 2nd FIFA World Cup. Juventus have contributed numerous players to Italy's World Cup campaigns, these successful periods principally have coincided with two golden ages of the Turin club's history, referred as Quinquennio d'Oro (The Golden Quinquennium), from 1931 until 1935, and Ciclo Leggendario (The Legendary Cycle), from 1972 to 1986.

Below are a list of Juventus players who represented the Italy national team during World Cup winning tournaments.
 1934 FIFA World Cup (9): Gianpiero Combi, Virginio Rosetta, Luigi Bertolini, Felice Borel IIº, Umberto Caligaris, Giovanni Ferrari, Luis Monti, Raimundo Orsi and Mario Varglien Iº
 1938 FIFA World Cup (2): Alfredo Foni and Pietro Rava
 1982 FIFA World Cup (6): Dino Zoff, Antonio Cabrini, Claudio Gentile, Paolo Rossi, Gaetano Scirea and Marco Tardelli
 2006 FIFA World Cup (5): Fabio Cannavaro, Gianluigi Buffon, Mauro Camoranesi, Alessandro Del Piero and Gianluca Zambrotta

Two Juventus players have won the golden boot award at the World Cup with Italy, Paolo Rossi in 1982 and Salvatore Schillaci in 1990. As well as contributing to Italy's World Cup winning sides, two Juventus players Alfredo Foni and Pietro Rava, represented Italy in the gold medal-winning squad at the 1936 Summer Olympics.

Seven Juventus players represented their nation during the 1968 European Championship win for Italy: Sandro Salvadore, Ernesto Càstano and Giancarlo Bercellino. and four in the UEFA Euro 2020: Giorgio Chiellini, Leonardo Bonucci, Federico Bernardeschi and Federico Chiesa; a national record.

The Torinese club has also contributed to a lesser degree to the national sides of other nations due to the limitations pre-Bosman rule (1995).
Zinedine Zidane and captain Didier Deschamps were Juventus players when they won the 1998 World Cup with France, as well as Blaise Matuidi in the 2018 World Cup, and the Argentines Angel Di Maria and Leandro Paredes in 2022, making it as the association football club which supplied the most FIFA World Cup winners globally (27). Three Juventus players have also won the European Championship with a nation other than Italy, Luis del Sol won it in 1964 with Spain, while the Frenchmen Michel Platini and Zidane won the competition in 1984 and 2000 respectively.

Financial information 

Founded as an association, in 1923, during the Edoardo Agnelli presidency, the club, at the time ruled by an assemblea di soci (membership assembly), became one of the first in the country to acquire professional status ante litteram, starting also the longest and most uninterrupted society in Italian sports history between a club and a private investor. Juventus was restructured as the football section of multisports parent company Juventus – Organizzazione Sportiva S.A. since the constitution of the later in that year to 1943, when it was merged with another three Torinese enterprises for founding the Compagnia Industriale Sportiva Italia (CISITALIA). In that twenty years Juventus progressive competed in different disciplines such as tennis, swimming, ice hockey, and bocce, gaining success in the first cited. After a long liquidation process of the automotive corporation started after the Italian Civil War (1945), all Juventus O.S.A. sections were closed with the exception of football and tennis, which were demerged. The football section, then called Juventus Cisitalia for sponsorship reasons, was renamed Juventus Football Club and the Agnelli family, which some members have held different executive charges inside the club for the past six years, obtained the club's majority shares after industrialist Piero Dusio, Cisitalia owner, transferred his capital shares in the ending of the decade. Juventus has been constituted as an independent società a responsabilità limitata (S.r.l.), a type of private limited company, in August 1949 and supervised by a consiglio d'amministrazione (board of directors) since then.

On 27 June 1967, the Torinese club changed its legal corporate status to società per azioni (S.p.A.) and on 3 December 2001 it became the third in the country to has been listed on the Borsa Italiana after Lazio and Roma; since that date until 19 September 2011, Juventus' stock took part of the Segmento Titoli con Alti Requisiti (STAR), one of the main market segment in the world. Since October 2016 to December 2018, and again since March 2020, The club's stock is iscrited in the FTSE Italia Mid Cap stock market index of the Mercato Telematico Azionario (MTA); previously, between December 2018 and March 2020, it was listed in the FTSE MIB index. The club has also a secondary listing on Borsa's sister stock exchange based in London.

As of 29 October 2021, the Juventus' shares are distributed between 63.8% to the Agnelli family through EXOR N.V., a holding part of the Giovanni Agnelli and C.S.a.p.a Group, 11.9% to Lindsell Train Investment Trust Ltd. and 24.3% distributed to other stakeholders (<3% each) though the Associazione Piccoli Azionisti della Juventus Football Club, created in 2010 and composed by more  affiliated, including investors as the Royal Bank of Scotland, the Norway Government Pension Fund Global, one sovereign wealth fund, the California Public Employees' Retirement System (CalPERS) and the investment management corporation BlackRock.

From 1 July 2008, the club has implemented a safety management system for employees and athletes in compliance with the requirements of international OHSAS 18001:2007 regulation and a Safety Management System in the medical sector according to the international ISO 9001:2000 resolution.

The club is one of the founding members of the European Club Association (ECA), which was formed after the merge of the G-14, an independent group of selected European clubs with international TV rights purposes, with the European Clubs Forum (ECF), a clubs' task force ruled by UEFA composed by 102 members, which Juventus was a founder and permanent member by sporting merits, respectively.

The Old Lady was placed seventh in the global ranking drawn up by the British consultancy organisation Brand Finance in terms of brand power, where it was rated with a credit rating AAA ("extremely strong") with a score of 86.1 out of 100, as well as eleventh in terms of brand value (€705 billion) and ninth by enterprise value (€2294 billion as of 24 May 2022). All this made I Bianconeri, in 2015, the country's second sports club—first in football—after Scuderia Ferrari by brand equity.

According to the Deloitte Football Money League, a research published by consultants Deloitte Touche Tohmatsu in March 2022, Juventus is the ninth-highest earning football club in the world with an estimated revenue of €433.5 million as of 30 June 2021 and, on 2002, the club reached the second position overall, the highest-ever achieved for a Serie A team, a ranking which they retained for the following two years. It is ranked in the ninth place on Forbes' list of the most valuable football clubs at international level with an estimate value of US$2450 million (€2279 million as of 31 May 2021), and, in May 2016, it became the first football club in the country to cross the billion euro mark. Finally, in both rankings, it is placed as the first Italian club.

On 14 September 2020, Juventus officially announced that Raffles Family Office, a Hong Kong-based multi-family office would be the club's Regional Partner in Asia for the next three years.

Kit suppliers and shirt sponsors

Kit deals

See also 
 Dynasties in Italian football
 List of football clubs in Italy by major honours won
 List of sports clubs inspired by others
 List of world champion football clubs

Notes

References

Bibliography

Books

Other publications

External links 

  
 Juventus F.C.  at Serie A 
 Juventus F.C. at UEFA

 
1897 establishments in Italy
Association football clubs established in 1897
Coppa Italia winning clubs
Football clubs in Italy
Football clubs in Turin
G-14 clubs
Italian football First Division clubs
Publicly traded sports companies
Serie A winning clubs
Serie A clubs
Serie B clubs
UEFA Champions League winning clubs
UEFA Cup Winners' Cup winning clubs
UEFA Cup winning clubs
UEFA Super Cup winning clubs
UEFA Intertoto Cup winning clubs
Intercontinental Cup winning clubs